Great Hearts Academies is a non-profit charter school management organization that operates a network of primary, middle, and high schools in the Phoenix, Arizona Metropolitan area and in San Antonio, Ft. Worth, and Irving, Texas.

Great Hearts Academies has 22,000+ students enrolled for the 2020-2021 school year.

Curriculum 
Great Hearts is a K-12 charter school that offers a humanities-based liberal arts education to the public, tuition free. It focuses on a core reading list filled with Great Books called Classics to Keep.  The Archway campuses, the elementary schools of the network, all teach phonics, spelling, handwriting, and grammar as a part of their classical curriculum. Additionally, they use the Core Knowledge curriculum (designed by E.D. Hirsch) for teaching in-depth and chronological world history and American history and geography as well as studio art and music. They use Singapore Math as their math curriculum and offer foreign language such as (depending on the school) Spanish, French, or Latin.

At the prep school level (middle and high school), students are required to study literature and composition, humanities, laboratory sciences, and mathematics. Great Hearts only offers one track of studies, but allows students to select from language courses including Spanish, French, Latin, and Greek, depending on the school.

Great Hearts Academy graduates proceed immediately to college or university at a rate of 98 percent, with 54 percent pursuing STEM (Science, Technology, Engineering and Mathematics) courses of study. Six of the top 20 charter schools in Phoenix are in the Great Hearts system, and Great Hearts students achieve SAT scores more than 300 points higher than the national average.

Controversies

Policy on transgender students 
In June 2016, the Great Hearts corporate Board of Directors adopted a policy that requires their transgender students to align all school activities with their biological sex, rather than the student's gender identity. The student's participation in extracurricular clubs, sports, and the use of facilities such as restrooms all must align with the sex of the student as printed on his or her birth certificate. This requirement extends further to Great Hearts' gendered hair cutting standards, school uniform requirements, "girls line/boys line" classroom management, and daily pronoun usage.

Great Hearts' policy on transgender students is strongly opposed by local LGBT organizations and transgender advocates. Opponents to the policy argue that Great Hearts has chosen to ignore clear guidance from the medical and psychological communities regarding how best to support their transgender student population.

Great Hearts argues that, since the civil rights of the transgender population is not yet a matter of settled law in the United States, the Board of Directors will define school policy in line with current statutory guidance and use the birth certificate as the official document that defines a student's gender.

Local reaction 
On April 25, 2017, the city council of Scottsdale, Arizona discussed whether to move forward with exploring a land agreement between the city and Great Hearts Academies to build an athletic complex near the community of DC Ranch. The City Council cited concerns they have before finalizing any agreement with Great Hearts, chief among them the Great Hearts policy on transgender students.

The Arizona chapter of the American Civil Liberties Union (ACLU) issued a press release opposing the city's partnership with Great Hearts until the policy is replaced. Great Hearts abandoned the land deal with the City of Scottsdale in favor of purchasing land adjacent to their already-established high school.

Haircut standards 
In February 2018, Teleos Preparatory Academy in Phoenix, part of the Great Hearts charter school system, notified one of their students that his hairstyle did not conform to the school's policy standard. The child's family argued that he was targeted because he was not white. Great Hearts responded with a statement reinforcing their policy of no braided hair on boys and that Great Hearts was "sorry to see this family leave the Teleos Prep community... we fully respect their decision to do so."

The Arizona chapter of the ACLU together with Black Mothers Forum, a local advocacy organization, called on Great Hearts to eliminate their grooming standards. Eight days later, Great Hearts offered to make a policy exception and readmit the family. The family refused.

Homework assignment on slavery 
In April 2018, Great Hearts apologized after one of their teachers in Texas assigned homework in which students were to list the pros and cons of being a slave. Social media spread the story of the homework assignment nationwide, sparking outrage. In response, Great Hearts issued a statement condemning the homework assignment.

Although the same homework assignment had been given in the past, the teacher who gave the assignment was reprimanded and briefly placed on leave. He was reinstated after remedial training was complete.

Response to the Black Lives Matter protests

On September 5, 2020, an art teacher at Great Hearts Western Hills in San Antonio, Texas was terminated by Great Hearts for wearing a facemask that visibly said "Black Lives Matter" as a violation of the school's dress code policy.

See also
Classical education movement

References

Charter schools in Arizona
Charter schools in Texas